Bloomer is a city in Chippewa County, Wisconsin, United States. As of the 2010 census, the population of the city of Bloomer was 3,539.

History
Mr. Bloomer and a group of men from Galena, Illinois built a mill on the site in 1848. As winter approached he sold the dam to H. S. Allen and returned to Galena. Settled in 1855 the village was known as Vanville until 1867 when it was surveyed and platted.

Geography
Bloomer is located at  (45.102171, −91.491767).

Bloomer is along U.S. Highway 53 and Wisconsin Highway 40; and also County Roads F, Q, and SS. Wisconsin Highway 64 is nearby.

Demographics

2010 census
As of the census of 2010, there were 3,539 people, 1,562 households, and 932 families living in the city. The racial makeup of the city was 97.9% White, 0.3% African American, 0.2% Native American, 0.3% Asian, 0.3% from other races, and 1.0% from two or more races. Hispanic or Latino of any race were 0.8% of the population.

There were 1,562 households, of which 28.1% had children under the age of 18 living with them, 46.9% were married couples living together, 9.7% had a female householder with no husband present, 3.1% had a male householder with no wife present, and 40.3% were non-families. 34.5% of all households were made up of individuals, and 17.4% had someone living alone who was 65 years of age or older. The average household size was 2.25 and the average family size was 2.89.

The median age in the city was 40.2 years. 23.1% of residents were under the age of 18; 8.2% were between the ages of 18 and 24; 24% were from 25 to 44; 25.8% were from 45 to 64; and 19% were 65 years of age or older. The gender makeup of the city was 47.0% male and 53.0% female.

2000 census
As of the census of 2000, there were 3,347 people, 1,424 households, and 901 families living in the city. The population density was 1,246.0 people per square mile (480.4/km2). There were 1,487 housing units at an average density of 553.6 per square mile (213.4/km2). The racial makeup of the city was 99.13% White, 0.06% Black or African American, 0.27% Native American, 0.09% Asian, 0.06% from other races, and 0.39% from two or more races. 0.33% of the population were Hispanic or Latino of any race.

There were 1,424 households, out of which 27.8% had children under the age of 18 living with them, 53.7% were married couples living together, 7.3% had a female householder with no husband present, and 36.7% were non-families. 32.2% of all households were made up of individuals, and 16.6% had someone living alone who was 65 years of age or older. The average household size was 2.31 and the average family size was 2.92.

In the city, the population was spread out, with 24.0% under the age of 18, 8.1% from 18 to 24, 26.6% from 25 to 44, 20.7% from 45 to 64, and 20.6% who were 65 years of age or older. The median age was 39 years. For every 100 females, there were 88.4 males. For every 100 females age 18 and over, there were 83.4 males.

The median income for a household in the city was $42,635, and the median income for a family was $57,974.

Education
Bloomer High School is the local high school (9–12). Bloomer Middle School is the local middle school  (5–8) and Bloomer Elementary School is the local elementary school (4k-4).

Saint Paul's Catholic School is the local private Catholic school (5k-8).

St. Paul Lutheran School is a Christian Pre-K-8 school of the Wisconsin Evangelical Lutheran Synod in Bloomer.

Recreation
Bloomer hosts an annual jump rope competition and has been called the "jump rope capital of the world", a title it earned after being featured on national television.

See also

 List of cities in Wisconsin

References

External links

 
 Sanborn fire insurance maps: 1893 1902 1912

Cities in Chippewa County, Wisconsin
Cities in Wisconsin
Eau Claire–Chippewa Falls metropolitan area
Populated places established in 1855
1855 establishments in Wisconsin